The Arkansas lunar sample displays are two commemorative plaques consisting of small fragments of Moon specimen brought back with the Apollo 11 and Apollo 17 lunar missions and given in the 1970s to the people of the state of Arkansas by United States President Richard Nixon as goodwill gifts.

Description

Apollo 11

Apollo 17

History 

In 1976, the Arkansas Apollo 17 lunar sample display was presented to Arkansas governor David Pryor; Bill Clinton succeeded Pryor as Governor of Arkansas. Valued at several million dollars, the display was reported missing around 1980. It was rediscovered in 2011 by an archivist, according to the director of the Central Arkansas Library System. The archivist found it in a box of Clinton's gubernatorial materials in the basement of the Butler Center for Arkansas Studies in Little Rock. The plastic ball container holding the Moon rock was broken off in a box of Clinton's gubernatorial materials. (It has since been reattached.) It was turned over for display at the Arkansas Museum of Discovery in Little Rock.

According to Moon rocks researcher Robert Pearlman, the Arkansas Apollo 11 lunar sample display is also housed at the Arkansas Museum of Discovery.

See also
 List of Apollo lunar sample displays

References

Further reading 
 

Apollo program lunar sample displays
Apollo program